A codebook is a type of document used for gathering and storing codes.

Codebook may also refer to:
CodeBook, software used in building information modeling
The Code Book, a 1999 book by Simon Singh
 Codebook algorithm, an algorithm used in cryptography
 Codebook, a password management software by Zetetic LLC
 Codebook excited linear prediction, a speech coding algorithm
 Electronic codebook (ECB), a mode of encryption in cryptography